Dead of Summer is an American supernatural horror television series created by Adam Horowitz, Edward Kitsis and Ian Goldberg for Freeform. The series is set in the 1980s at Camp Stillwater, a Midwestern summer camp. In November 2015, Freeform gave a straight-to-series order. The series was conceived as an anthology, with each season conceived as a self-contained miniseries, following a different set of characters in similar settings.

The series premiered on June 28, 2016 and concluded on August 30, 2016. Dead of Summer was produced by ABC Signature and Kitsis/Horowitz. Adam Horowitz, Edward Kitsis and Ian Goldberg wrote and executive-produced the series. Steve Pearlman served as executive producer. On November 8, 2016, Freeform cancelled the series after one season.

Premise
Set in 1989, school is out for the summer, and a sun-drenched season of firsts beckons the counselors at Camp Stillwater, a seemingly idyllic Midwestern summer camp, including first loves, first kisses—and first kills. Stillwater’s dark, ancient mythology awakens, and what was supposed to be a summer of fun soon turns into one of unforgettable scares and evil at every turn.

Cast and characters

Main
 Elizabeth Mitchell as Deb Carpenter
 Elizabeth Lail as Amy Hughes
 Amber Coney as Carolina "Cricket" Diaz
 Alberto Frezza as Deputy Garrett "Townie" Sykes
 Eli Goree as Joel Goodson
 Mark Indelicato as Blair Ramos
Ronen Rubinstein as Alex Powell (born: Alexi Fayvinov)
 Paulina Singer as Jessica "Jessie/Braces" Tyler
 Zelda Williams as Drew Reeves (born: Andrea Dalton)

Recurring
 Charles Mesure as Sheriff Boyd Heelan / The Teacher
 Tony Todd as Holyoke, the Tall Man
 Andrew J. West as Damon Crowley
 Donnie Cochrane as Parker
 Zachary Gordon as Jason "Blotter" Cohen
 Janet Kidder as Mrs. Sykes

Guest
 Dylan Neal as Keith Jones
 Alex Fernandez as Hector Diaz
 Sharon Leal as Renee Tyler
 Dan Payne as Jack Sykes
 Taylor Russell as Laura

Episodes

Production

Development
Dead of Summer was ordered to series on November 18, 2015, along with an announcement that ABC Family would be transforming into Freeform in January 2016. The show is a reunion for Once Upon a Time creators Edward Kitsis and Adam Horowitz and one-time-writer Ian B. Goldberg. In February 2016 it was reported that Lost and Once Upon a Time stars Elizabeth Mitchell and Elizabeth Lail would headline the show, initiating another reunion between writers and cast. In April 2016, Freeform announced that the series would premiere on June 28, 2016.

On November 8, 2016, Freeform cancelled the series after one season. The series would have set its second season in 1970, with a third season to be set in the early 2000s.

Filming
The series began principal photography on March 21, 2016 in Vancouver, British Columbia. Horowitz directed the pilot episode, only his second episode of television as director, the first being the thirteenth episode of Once Upon a Times fourth season, "Unforgiven".

Reception
Dead of Summer has initially received mixed reviews from television critics. The review aggregator website Rotten Tomatoes reported a 63% approval rating, with an average rating of 6.05 out of 10, based on 16 reviews. The website's critical consensus reads, "Dead of Summer sets a spooky stage for a silly period creepfest, but its lack of actual scares adds up to an altogether underwhelming experience."

Molly Freeman of ScreenRant gave the series premiere a positive review stating, "While the premise of Dead of Summer sounds familiar to any horror movie fan, the show benefits from not being directly tied to an existing horror franchise since it won't suffer for being compared to movies beloved by generations." Sonia Saraiya of Variety also wrote a positive review: "Dead of Summer makes for a schlocky hour that never quite gets boring. At the very least, while escaping the dog days of summer inside with the air-conditioning, there's plenty of fun to be had in laughing at how bad it is."

Alex McGown of The A.V. Club gave the first episode a C rating, stating "Its story is so clunky, and characters so wafer-thin, it all but evaporates into a haze of trite jump-scare beats and hoary teen tropes." Dan Fienberg of The Hollywood Reporter gave a more negative review: "Dead of Summer is just run-of-the-mill unintentionally bad -- a mishmash of genres and structures and stock characters that maybe aspires to something original and falls flat."

As the series continued, reviews became more positive. Paul Dailly of TV Fanatic gave a perfect score of 5.0/5.0 to the fifth episode saying, "'How to Stay Alive in the Woods' was a stellar episode of the freshman drama. We got so many reveals and the pace was brisk. Fingers crossed the rest of the season plays out in this manner."

References

External links
 
 

2016 American television series debuts
2016 American television series endings
Freeform (TV channel) original programming
2010s American horror television series
2010s American LGBT-related drama television series
2010s American supernatural television series
2010s American teen drama television series
English-language television shows
Television series set in the 1980s
Television series by ABC Signature Studios
Television series about summer camps
Television series set in 1989
Television shows set in Wisconsin